Szikszó is a small town in Borsod-Abaúj-Zemplén county, Northern Hungary,  from county capital Miskolc.

History
Szikszó was first mentioned in documents in 1280. It belonged to the estate of the Aba clan. After 1370 Aba Estates in the area became the property of King Sigismund and then of Queen Mary. At this time Szikszó was already a royal town. The Gothic church of the town was also built around this time.

In the 16th century Szikszó and its landowners converted to the Protestant faith and its church became a Protestant one.

During the Ottoman occupation of Hungary the town was ransacked and burnt down several times. The citizens fortified the strongest building of the town, the church. Several battles of the Ottoman–Habsburg wars were fought in and around the town. In 1588 there was a battle near the town, where the Hungarian army defeated the Turks. In 1679 the town witnessed another battle, this time against the imperial army of the Habsburgs; this battle too brought Hungarian victory but the imperials burnt down the town as revenge.

During the freedom fight against Habsburg rule in 1848, a third battle was fought near Szikszó. Again the Hungarians won.

In 1852, a house caught fire and the whole town burnt down. Rebuilding the town was very expensive and the citizens couldn't afford the expenses of Szikszó being classified as a town, so in 1866, they asked the government to re-classify Szikszó as a village.

In 1920, after the Treaty of Trianon, Košice (Kassa in Hungarian) became part of Czechoslovakia, and Szikszó became the capital of Abaúj-Torna county. It held this rank until the unification of the three counties created Borsod-Abaúj-Zemplén county.

During World War II, Szikszó was captured by Soviet troops of the 2nd Ukrainian Front on 30 November 1944 in the course of the Budapest Offensive.

In 1989 Szikszó was granted town status again.

Education
Szepsi Csombor Márton High School

Tourist sights
 Bethania manor
 Gothic Protestant Church
 Wine cellars

Gallery

Twin towns – sister cities

Szikszó is twinned with:
 Dro, Italy
 Sovata, Romania
 Stronie Śląskie, Poland
 Waldems, Germany

References

External links

  in Hungarian
 Aerial photographs

Populated places in Borsod-Abaúj-Zemplén County